This is an episode listing for the Mexican sitcom Skimo.

Series overview

Episodes

Season 1 (2006)

Season 2 (2006–07)

Season 3 (2007)
At the beginning of this season, the twins turn Skimo into a Japanese bar. The season premiered Monday, April 23 & Friday, April 27.

Season 4 (2007–08)
This season was confirmed by Daniel Tovar in one of his recent interviews. One special thing that makes this season more oriented than the others, it's because this is the longest episode run season with 17 episodes. This is the last season of the show.

External links

 Episodes
Lists of comedy television series episodes
Lists of children's television series episodes
Lists of Nickelodeon television series episodes